Jeffrey Rijsdijk (born September 12, 1987 in Rotterdam) is a Dutch professional footballer of Indonesian descent who plays for VV Capelle. He formerly played for Sparta Rotterdam, FC Groningen, FC Dordrecht and Go Ahead Eagles.

References

External links
 
 Voetbal International profile 

1987 births
Living people
Dutch footballers
Sparta Rotterdam players
FC Groningen players
FC Dordrecht players
Go Ahead Eagles players
Almere City FC players
Kozakken Boys players
Eredivisie players
Eerste Divisie players
Tweede Divisie players
Footballers from Rotterdam
Association football midfielders
Dutch people of Indonesian descent